Alfons Bērziņš (7 November 1916 in Riga – 16 December 1987) was a Latvian long track speed skater. He competed at the 1936 Winter Olympics (got 14th place in the 500 m event). In 1939 he became overall champion at the European Championships.

Biography 
Alfons Bērziņš was born 7 November 1916 in Riga. He started his training in speed skating in 1932. His first coach was former Olympic Latvian speed skater Alberts Rumba. In 1938 he graduated Riga city gymnasium No.2. During second half of the 1930s he was a member of the university team Universitātes sports (University sport). Before World War II he married Olympic Latvian mountain skier Mirdza Martinsone.

In 1942 he started engineering studies in University of Latvia however he never graduated. During World War II Bērziņš was conscripted in Latvian Legion in 1944 and served as a platoon commander in anti-aircraft unit (SS-Flak-Abteilung 506). In April 1944 he was awarded Iron Cross II class. With the capitulation of Courland Pocket in May 1945 Bērziņš entered Soviet captivity. He was sentenced to 10 years of hard labour in GULAG camp. He was released in 1955 and returned to Latvia. He started to work as a skating coach. One of his most famous pupils was Latvian speed skater Lāsma Kauniste.

Alfons Bērziņš died on 16 December 1987 in Riga. He was interred in the Riga Forest Cemetery.

Personal records
500 m – 42,9
1500 m – 2.16,4
5000 m – 8.32,8
10 000 m – 17.47,2

References

External links
 
 
 

1916 births
1987 deaths
Sportspeople from Riga
People from Kreis Riga
Latvian male speed skaters
Olympic speed skaters of Latvia
Speed skaters at the 1936 Winter Olympics
World Allround Speed Skating Championships medalists
Latvian Waffen-SS personnel
Latvian prisoners of war
Recipients of the Iron Cross (1939), 2nd class
Gulag detainees
Soviet sportspeople
Burials at Forest Cemetery, Riga